The 2017–18 Elitserien is the eleventh season of the present highest Swedish men's bandy top division, Elitserien. The regular season begins in late-October 2017.

Teams

Teams 1–10 from the regular 2016–17 Elitserien league were automatically qualified for this season's play in the top-tier divisionen. Three teams from the 2016–2017 season which played the qualification games (IK Tellus, Kalix BF och TB Västerås) managed to stay in the Elitserien, while Gripen Trollhättan BK was relegated to second-tier Allsvenskan and replaced by IFK Motala.

* – indoor arena

League table

Knock-out stage

Bracket

Quarter-finals

Sandvikens AIK vs IFK Vänersborg

Hammarby IF vs Vetlanda BK

Edsbyns IF vs Bollnäs GIF

Västerås SK vs Villa Lidköping BK

Semi-finals

Sandvikens AIK vs Hammarby IF

Edsbyns IF vs Villa Lidköping BK

Final

Relegation playoffs

References

Elitserien (bandy) seasons
Bandy
Bandy
Elitserien
Elitserien